The West Country (occasionally Westcountry) is a loosely defined area of South West England, usually taken to include all, some, or parts of the counties of Cornwall, Devon, Dorset, Somerset, Bristol, and, less commonly, Wiltshire, Gloucestershire and Herefordshire. The West Country has a distinctive regional English dialect and accent, and is also home to the Cornish language.

Extent

The West Country is bounded by the English Channel in the south and the Bristol Channel, Severn Estuary or Herefordshire in the north. The eastern limit is less clearly defined. Some definitions match that of the official South West England region. Others refer to three counties, Cornwall, Devon and Somerset; while some take in Herefordshire (officially part of the West Midlands region).

In a 2019 YouGov survey, 72% of respondents considered Cornwall and Devon to be in the West Country, while 70% included Somerset, 69% included Bristol, and 55% included Dorset. Other counties received less than 50% agreement, with 28% including Wiltshire, 27% including Gloucestershire, 12% including Herefordshire and 9% including Worcestershire.

Specific uses
The term West Country derby is used to refer to sports matches between such cities as Bristol and Bath or Gloucester and Bath.

West Country Lamb and West Country Beef are EU Protected Geographical Indications (PGI) covering products from animals born and reared in Cornwall, Devon, Dorset, Somerset, Wiltshire or Gloucestershire. "West Country Farmhouse Cheddar" is a Protected Designation of Origin (PDO) limited to cheddar cheese made in the traditional way in Cornwall, Devon, Dorset or Somerset.

ITV West Country is an ITV franchise which broadcasts local news, weather and current affairs programmes over two regions; ITV West Country West covering the Isles of Scilly, Cornwall, Devon and parts of Dorset and Somerset with ITV West Country East covering the remainder of Somerset and Dorset together with Bristol, Gloucestershire and Wiltshire. ITV West Country West was an ITV franchise in its own right until 2014 when it merged with that of ITV West, formerly HTV West, having been initially launched as Westcountry Television with its main studios in Plymouth in 1993. 

West Country Carnivals are held in many towns in and around Somerset. A government-supported museum, galleries, and major attractions atlas matched the South West Region, save for Gloucestershire. 

The former brewery in Cheltenham traded as West Country Ales; their ceramic plaques can still be seen built into pub walls.

See also
West Country English
Scrumpy and Western music
South West Peninsula
Thomas Hardy's Wessex
Wessex
West of England
West Country derby
SR West Country and Battle of Britain classes (West Country-class locomotives)
Dumnonia
Durotriges

References

Further reading
Jenner, Michael (1996) Traveller's Companion to the West Country. Claremont Books (Godfrey Cave Associates)  (first published by Michael Joseph, 1990)
Weir, John (1993) The West Country. (Great Walks.) London: Ward Lock 

 
South West England
Southern England